Savage Neck Dunes Natural Area Preserve is a  Natural Area Preserve located in Northampton County, Virginia on the Chesapeake Bay.  dunes within the preserve are among the highest points on Virginia's Eastern Shore. The preserve contains beach, dune, and maritime forest natural communities of various sorts, as well as habitat for migratory songbirds and northeastern beach tiger beetles. Regionally rare plants at the preserve include Engelmann's umbrella-sedge (Cyperus engelmannii), dwarf burhead (Echinodorus tenellus), and southern bladderwort (Utricularia juncea).

The preserve is owned and maintained by the Virginia Department of Conservation and Recreation, and is open to the public. Improvements at the site include three trails that have been marked off for hiking, and there is a small public parking area near the entrance.

See also
 List of Virginia Natural Area Preserves

References

External links
Virginia Department of Conservation and Recreation: Savage Neck Dunes Natural Area Preserve

Virginia Natural Area Preserves
Protected areas of Northampton County, Virginia
Beaches of Virginia